Filaret Galchev (born 26 May 1963) is a Russian businessman of Pontic Greek origin. He is the owner & chairman of Eurocement group.

Early life
Filaret Illitch Galchev was born into an ethnic Greek family in Tarson, a small village in Tsalka District, Georgian Soviet Socialist Republic, on 26 May 1963. He graduated from Moscow Mining Institute.

Career
In 1996, Galchev and his partner, Georgy Krasnyansky, created Rosuglesbyt which became a leading Russian coal enterprise. Then in 2000, Galchev partnered with Sergei Generalov, then Russian Minister of Fuel and Energy, to privatize the Krasnoyarsk Coal Company. In 2002, Galchev sold his stake in the company to the MDM Group and immediately bought shares of Sterncement because he saw potential in the cement industry. By 2004, Galchev's cement holdings produced 9.6 million tons of cement.

According to Forbes, Galchev has a net worth of $1 billion and the companies of Eurocement Group in which he is on the board of directors have a production capacity of over 60 million tons of cement and 11 million m3 of concrete.

Personal life
He is married with two children and lives in Moscow, and is a citizen of Greece

References 

1963 births
Living people
Businesspeople from Tbilisi
Russian people of Greek descent
Russian businesspeople
Russian billionaires
Businesspeople in cement
Moscow State Mining University alumni